The 2021–22 Belarusian Extraliga season was the 30th season of the Belarusian Extraliga, the top level of ice hockey in Belarus. Twelve teams participated in the league.

Regular season

First round

Second round

Group A

Group B

Statistics

Scoring leaders 

The following shows the top ten players who led the league in points, at the conclusion of matches played on 20 February 2022.

Leading goaltenders
The following shows the top ten goaltenders who led the league in goals against average, provided that they have played at least 40% of their team's minutes, at the conclusion of matches played on 7 October 2021.

Playoffs

Bracket

Qualification round

Quarterfinals

Semifinals

Finals

Final rankings

References

External links 
Official site 
Belarus Extraliga on eurohockey.com
Belarus Extraliga on eliteprospects.com

bel
Belarusian Extraleague seasons
Extraleague